Vladimir Delman (26 January 1923 in Petrograd – 28 August 1994 in Bologna) was a Russian conductor. After leaving the Soviet Union in 1974 he settled in Italy, where he founded the Milan Symphony Orchestra in 1993.

References
  The New York Times

1923 births
1994 deaths
20th-century Russian conductors (music)
Russian male conductors (music)
20th-century Russian male musicians